Otis Grant (August 13, 1961 – May 29, 2011) was an American football wide receiver who played three seasons in the National Football League with the Los Angeles Rams and Philadelphia Eagles. He was drafted by the Rams in the fifth round of the 1983 NFL Draft. He played college football at Michigan State University and attended George Washington Carver High School in Atlanta, Georgia.

College career
Grant played for the Michigan State Spartans from 1979 to 1982, recording 1,358 yards and twelve touchdowns on 79 receptions.

Professional career
Grant was selected by the Los Angeles Rams with the 134th pick in the 1983 NFL Draft. He played in 30 games, starting three, for the Rams from 1983 to 1984. He was released by the Rams on August 27, 1985.

Grant played in three games, all starts, as a replacement player for the Philadelphia Eagles during the 1987 NFL players' strike.

Personal life
Grant worked in various areas, including security and as a marketing manager, after retiring from football.

References

External links
Just Sports Stats

1961 births
2011 deaths
Players of American football from Atlanta
American football wide receivers
African-American players of American football
Michigan State Spartans football players
Los Angeles Rams players
Philadelphia Eagles players
20th-century American businesspeople
American marketing businesspeople
African-American businesspeople
Businesspeople from Georgia (U.S. state)
National Football League replacement players
20th-century African-American sportspeople
21st-century African-American people